André Green may refer to:

André Green (athlete) (born 1973), retired German runner
André Green (psychoanalyst) (1927–2012), French psychoanalyst

See also
 Andre Green, English footballer